Madeira is a village (in Tzaneen town) in Mopani District Municipality in the Limpopo province of South Africa.

References

Populated places in the Maruleng Local Municipality